Garvey Park is a multi-use stadium in Tavua, Fiji named after the colonial governor Ronald Garvey. It is currently used mostly for football and also for Colonial Cup and Digicel Cup matches and hosts the home matches of Tavua F.C. and the Bligh Roosters.  The stadium holds 4,500 people.

References 

Football venues in Fiji
Multi-purpose stadiums in Fiji
Rugby league stadiums in Fiji
Rugby union stadiums in Fiji